Sir Cowasjee Jehangir High School is a co-educational private school in Tardeo, Mumbai, Maharashtra, India. It was established in 1859 by Sir Cowasji Jehangir Readymoney, a notable Parsi community leader, philanthropist and industrialist of the city.

The school caters to pupils from kindergarten up to class 10 and is affiliated to the Maharashtra State Board of Secondary and Higher Secondary Education which conducts the Secondary School Certificate (SSC) examinations at the close of class 10.

History 
Formerly known as Sir Cowasjee Jehangir Girls High School, it was founded by Cowasji Jehangir Readymoney in 1859 at Khetwadi and maintained by him until his death in 1878.

In 1903, a building was purchased at Khetwadi, 12th Lane, towards the cost of which Jehangir Cowasji Jehangir Readymoney contributed the major portion and the school was maintained by his family up till 1929.

In 1929, Bai Cooverbai D. Mama, a niece of the founder, bequeathed by her will a sum of Rs. 2,15,000 to the school, which after paying for the maintenance amounted in 1938 to Rs. 2,40,000. Out of this bequest, Rs. 70,000 was spent on the construction of this building on the land given by Sir Cowasji Jehangir, 2nd Baronet. The Dowager Lady Dhunbai Cowasjee Jehangir donated Rs. 70,000 in memory of her husband, the 2nd baronet.

Curriculum 
The school follows the SSC board which is the state board of the Government of Maharashtra. It runs classes from Standard One to Standard Ten. The primary and secondary school occupy different buildings. A class has two sections 'A' and 'B' with approximately forty to fifty students each.

All students of the secondary school belong to one of four houses - blue, green, red and orange. Each house has an elected House Captain from Standard Ten and a Vice-Captain from Standard Nine. Additionally a School Captain and Vice-Captain are elected from Standard Ten. These student representatives maintain student discipline and lead student and sports activities.

See also 
 List of schools in Mumbai
 Jehangir Baronets

References 

Private schools in Mumbai
High schools and secondary schools in Mumbai
Educational institutions established in 1859
1859 establishments in India
Schools in Colonial India